The Black Panthers (translit. HaPanterim HaShkhorim) were an Israeli protest movement of second-generation Jewish immigrants from North Africa and Middle Eastern countries. It was one of the first organizations in Israel with the mission of working for social justice for Sephardi and Mizrahi Jews, drawing inspiration and borrowing the name from the African-American organization Black Panther Party. It is also sometimes referred to as the Israeli Black Panthers to distinguish them from the original American group.

History

The movement was founded early in 1971 by young people in the Musrara neighborhood of Jerusalem, in reaction to discrimination against Mizrahi Jews, which existed since the establishment of the state. The movement's founders protested "ignorance from the establishment for the hard social problems", and wanted to fight for a different future. All of the initial ten members were children of Moroccan immigrants, around ages 18–20, and most had dropped out of elementary school and spent some time in juvenile delinquent institutions. They were influenced by the Community Work Division of the Jerusalem municipality, who introduced them to the mass media as an outlet for expressing their demands for change. Other forces of influence were anti-Zionist high-school and university students.

The Black Panthers felt that discrimination against Mizrahi Jews could be seen in the different attitude of the Ashkenazi establishment towards the immigrants from the Soviet Union. While most other Mizrahi organizations in Israel were religious, such as Shas, the Black Panthers were secular in orientation.

After the 1947–1949 Palestine war, Musrara went from being a wealthy Arab neighborhood to a neglected area with a dangerous no-man's land full of mines, on the border of Israel and Jordan's West Bank. Jewish immigrants from the Middle East and North Africa were not given adequate housing by the Israeli government and many settled in Musrara. After the 1967 Six-Day War, Musrara went from being a dangerous neighborhood on the border, to being the center of a united Jerusalem. The government began planning to rebuild the neighborhood with high-rise apartment complexes for Soviet immigrants, meaning that the North African Jewish residents would be displaced. Charlie Bitton, Sa'adia Marziano, Roni Orovitz, Reuven Abergel, Meir Levi and Kochavi Shemesh were prominent members of the Party in its early days. They succeeded to make people believe that their movement would improve the lives of the disenfranchised and received media attention.

Protest activities 
In the beginning of 1971, the establishment of the movement was publicized, and it was distributed that the leaders of the movement had criminal records. The authorities became worried that the events of the Wadi Salid riots would be repeated. Shimshon Vigodar made a leaflet before the first organized demonstration and along with three other members of Matzpen, hung them around Musrara. While distributing the leaflet, they were arrested by the police. Vigodar pointed out the difference in treatment towards the newly formed Black Panthers and Matzpen: "When we were in Matzpen, there was no scenario in which we would be thrown in jail for no reason before a protest. I don't remember in the history of Matzpen that we were ever arrested for incitement."

At the beginning of March 1971, the Israel Police denied the Black Panthers a permit for a demonstration, due to some of them having criminal records, and some members of the Party were arrested to prevent the demonstration. The authorities promised the Panthers that funds would be allocated towards Jerusalem neighborhoods. The Panthers ignored this decision and proceeded with the demonstration without a permit, gathering in front of Jerusalem's City Hall on March 2, 1971, to protest the distress of poverty, the gap between poor and rich in Israel, and the ethnic tensions within Jewish Israeli society. They passed out a leaflet calling for actions to stop class and ethnic discrimination within Jewish Israeli society and for the release of the arrested organizers. The protest gained more attention in part due to the fact that it was illegal. About 200 to 300 people attended, primarily Israeli and foreign students and some intellectuals, rather than young people from Musrara. The movement successfully built a base of supporters, both in the public and in the media.

On 18 May 1971, "The Night of the Panthers", the Israeli Black Panthers organized between 5,000 and 7,000 people to gather in a mass demonstration against racial discrimination. The protest started in Davidka Square in Jerusalem and when they started heading to Zion Square, seven hours of clashes between police and demonstrators began. The demonstrators also demanded to change the name of the square to Kikar Yehadut HaMizrah (Eastern Jewry Square). This demonstration was also held without police permission. Historian Oz Frankel describes "A police water cannon sprayed rioters with jets of water dyed green, only increasing the panic on the street. More than 100 people were arrested, many just onlookers, with several instances of police brutality recorded. Arrests continued into the following day. Close to midnight, demonstrators threw three Molotov cocktails." Prime Minister Golda Meir  dismissed the protestors, calling for unity among Jews. Oz continues, "The government then pressured the Panthers to join the establishment‐approved Alliance of Moroccan Immigrants. The Panthers relented, temporarily, so that their jailed comrades would be released."

Prior to the demonstration, representatives of the Panthers had met with Golda Meir on 13 April, who characterized them as "not nice people". She saw the leaders of the movement as lawbreakers and refused to recognize them as a social movement. The violent protest of 18 May brought the government to discuss seriously the Panthers' claims and a public committee was established to find a solution.

According to the conclusions of that committee, discrimination did exist at many levels in society. Following this, the budgets of the offices dealing with social issues were enlarged significantly. However, the 1973 Yom Kippur War soon changed the government's list of priorities, and most of these resources were turned, again, towards security needs.

Following "The Night of the Panthers" and the Panthers' newfound publicity, the group had hoped to build a nationwide, grassroots movement, but was unable to due to internal conflicts and limited organizational ability. They did organize several demonstrations during March through August 1971. The group had an active periphery of supporters made up of younger boys from Musrara, and some committed helpers, including intellectuals and anti-Zionist student groups. They in many ways maintained their structure as a neighborhood group prior to becoming the Black Panthers, with Marciano as leader of the group. The Panthers made connections with a large network of people in the establishment and outside of it, such as members of Knesset, Histadrut, and the Jewish Agency. The large-scale response to the Black Panthers, especially from the State, declined after several months, as the Panthers were unable to mobilize large parts of the population.

Move to electoral politics 
The Panthers eventually moved into electoral politics, but without success, at least in part because of internal disputes and struggles. In the 1973 Knesset elections the party won 13,332 votes (0.9%), just short of the 1% threshold. For the 1977 elections Charlie Biton ran on the Hadash list. He was re-elected three times, before leaving Hadash to establish the Black Panthers as an independent Knesset faction in 1990. Some of the movement's leaders integrated into either the main Israeli parties, specific ethnic parties such as Tami or Shas, and through them promoted the Mizrahi Jews' agenda. Reuven Abergel has since been active in the struggle for social justice and peace in Israel and the Palestinian territories as a member of various groups and movements. He currently serves on the board of the Mizrahi Democratic Rainbow.

The young Black Panther activists raised public consciousness to the "Oriental question", which subsequently played a role in Israeli political debate in the 1970s and 1980s, contributing to Likud success in that period. Although inequalities remain, many Mizrahi Jews have over the years entered the mainstream of Israeli political, military, cultural  and economic life, including Moroccan-born Amir Peretz and David Levy, Iraqi-born Shlomo Hillel, Benjamin Ben-Eliezer and Yitzhak Mordechai and Iranian-born Shaul Mofaz and Moshe Katzav.

Israeli government infiltration 
In 2007, the Israel State Archives released documents revealing that Ya'akov Elbaz, one of the Black Panthers who had met with Golda Meir, was a police informant. He was older than the Party members at about forty and was known for being involved in organized crime. The police recruited him to work undercover in the Black Panthers. The police paid him and ignored his pimp activities. "The police were worried that the Panthers would use violence like the U.S. Black Panthers, so they wanted to be informed on their activities," said detective Avraham Turgiman.

Elbaz joined the Party shortly after the first demonstration and had a prominent presence because he supplied large sums of money and strongly advocated for violence. He became one of the leaders of the movement, and at one point was elected as the President of the organization. Kochavi Shemesh, another member of the Party, said that Elbaz was one of the leaders who promoted violent struggle, provided Molotov cocktails, and was a provocateur on behalf of the police. Charlie Bitton said that he now knows that Elbaz “was planted by the police in the organization to try to make it look more radical.”

The State Archives include internal newsletters and conversations revealing daily activities, likely information provided by Elbaz. It is likely that the police had a number of informants in the Party besides Elbaz. This introduced distrust to the Party, contributing to tension and discord.

The name "Black Panther" 
The Israeli Black Panthers adopted the name of the United States Black Panther Party along with groups in the United Kingdom, West Indies, West Africa, and South Asia. The groups were united by migrant identities and adopted grassroots strategies and interethnic solidarity in order to resist racist social structures. The name was suggested in Israel by one of the founders of the party, Sa'adia Marziano.

There are two theories on how the group came to the name. One is that Marziano or Abergel met with Angela Davis prior to choosing the name. Davis, who was involved with the Black Panther Party of the US, may have been involved in helping the Israeli Party develop its ideology. The other theory is that a social worker in the neighborhood told them that they sounded like the Black Panthers from the U.S.

Marziano was an organizer against police profiling and in 1970, at a meeting with a group of organizers, he allegedly suggested that they form a Black Panther Party in Israel. He wanted the group to have organization and militancy similar to the original Black Panthers. They also chose the name because they thought it would give them media attention, which proved to be true.

The group in part adopted the name in order to give it recognition among Ashkenazi Jews inside and outside of Israel, many of whom had American backgrounds and would be familiar with African American history. They thought the name would be provoking, and keep the group from being forgotten like Eastern organizations before them. While the group knew little about the original Black Panthers, they identified with the name broadly, and it inspired them to express protest politics. The group did have knowledge of African American history. They renamed their neighborhood of Musrara, Harlem/Musrara. They identified with African Americans and viewed themselves as being subjected to discrimination and racism, as well. They believed that ethnic and class discrimination divided Israeli society into two, and did not believe assimilation was an option.

Commemoration

During the late 1990s and early 2000s a movement by the name the Russian Panthers (as a reference to the Black Panthers) was formed after attacks against Russian-speaking immigrants.

A group of activists named two routes through Jerusalem's Musrara neighborhood "Black Panthers Way" and "They're Not Nice Alley" in 2011, the latter taken from the comments made about the Panthers by Golda Meir.

See also
Wadi Salib riots

References

Further reading

A. Kramer, On the 30th anniversary of the Black Panthers movement in Israel marxist.com, 20 August 2002

External links

Black Panthers Knesset website
Archive of documents and clippings
 Obituary of Black Panther founder Saadia Marciano
 [‘There is no peace without equality, and there is no equality without peace’ — the legacy of Israeli Black Panthers activist Kochavi Shemesh https://mondoweiss.net/2019/07/equality-panthers-activist/], Mati Shemoelof, Mondoweiss, 7.7.2019

Anti-racist organizations in Israel
1971 establishments in Israel
Jewish anti-racism
Jewish socialism
Political organizations based in Israel
Society of Israel
Mizrahi Jewish culture in Israel
Organizations established in 1971
Defunct political parties in Israel
Far-left politics in Israel
Socialist parties in Israel
Far-left political parties
Mizrahi Jews topics
Sephardi Jewish culture in Israel
Protests in Israel
Secular Jewish culture in Israel